Idaville is a census-designated place in Huntington Township, Adams County, Pennsylvania, United States. As of the 2020 census its population was 176. Idaville is served by the Bermudian Springs School District.

Geography
The town (which starts at the Adams-Cumberland County line) stretches for  along Route 34 and is separated from Tyrone Township, adjacent to the south end of the town, by Bermudian Creek.

Demographics

References

Census-designated places in Adams County, Pennsylvania
Census-designated places in Pennsylvania